Southern Lebanon is the area of Lebanon comprising the South Governorate and the Nabatiye Governorate. The two entities were divided from the same province in the early 1990s. The Rashaya and Western Beqaa Districts, the southernmost districts of the Beqaa Governorate, in Southern Lebanon are sometimes included.

The main cities of the region are Sidon, Tyre, Jezzine and Nabatiyeh. The cazas of Bint Jbeil, Tyre, and Nabatieh in Southern Lebanon are known for their large Shi'a Muslim population with a minority of Christians. Sidon is predominantly Sunni, with the rest of the caza of Sidon having a Shi'a Muslim majority, with a considerable Christian minority, mainly Melkite Greek Catholics. The cazas of Jezzine and Marjeyoun have a Christian majority and also Shia Muslims. The villages of Ain Ebel, Debel, Qaouzah, and Rmaich are entirely Christian Maronite. The caza of Hasbaya has a Druze majority.

History

Free Lebanon State and South Lebanon security belt
Southern Lebanon became the location of the self-proclaimed Free Lebanon State, announced in 1979 by Saad Haddad. The state failed to gain international recognition, and its authority deteriorated with the death of Saad Haddad in 1984.

Southern Lebanon has also featured prominently in the Israel-Lebanon conflict.

Ahmadinejad's state visit
In October 2010 Iranian President Mahmoud Ahmadinejad visited South Lebanon. This was his first visit to Lebanon since he first assumed office in Tehran in 2005. Both Israel and the United States condemned the trip as being "provocative." Ahmadinejad was welcomed by tens of thousands of supporters of Hezbollah, Iran's Shiite Muslim ally in Lebanon which has been  branded a terrorist organization in part or whole by much of South America, the EU, the Arab League, the United States and Israel. This is despite its participation in Lebanon's fragile government.

Cities and districts

 Aaramta
 Al Rihan
 Alma ash-Shab (Aalma ach Chaab)
 Abbasieh
 Adlun
 Al Mansuri
 Ain Ebel
 Ain Baal or Ayn Bal
 Aitaroun or Aytarun
 Ansariyeh or Insariye
 Ansar
 Ash Shawmara
 At Tayyabah
 At Tiri
 Aitit
 Aynata
 Ayta ash Shab (Ayta al-Sha'b, Ayta)
 Baraachit
 Barish
 Bayt Lif
 baytulay
 Bazouryeh
 Beit Yahoun
 Bint Jbeil
 Blida, Lebanon
 Borj el Shamali or Borj Chemali
 Borj Qalaouiyeh
 Borj Rahal
 Boustane
 Brashit
 Braikeh
 Chaqra
 Chtoura
 Deir Kifa
 Deyrintar
 Dayr Qanunc
 Deir Qanoun En Nahr
 Derdghaya
 Dibil or Debel
 Dibbine
 Doueir
 Ebel el Saki
 El Biyyadah or Al Bayyadah
 El Hennyeh or Al Hinniyah
 El Mansoun or Al Mansuri
 El Qlaile or Al Qulaylah
 El Soultaniyeh
 Fardis
 Frun
 Ghandouriyeh
 Ghaziyeh
 Ghassaniyeh
 Hadata or Haddathah
 Hanaway
 Harris or Harres
 Hula or Houla
 Hounin
 Jabal Amel
 Jarjouh
 Jarmaq
 jebchet
 Jmaijmah
 Joiya or Jouaya or Jwayya
 Qabrikha or Kabrikha
 Kaakaeit al-Jesser
 Kafra, Lebanon
 Kafr Dunin
 Kafr Kila
 Kawkaba or Kaoukaba
 Kfar Melki 
 Kafarrouman
 Khirbet Selm
 Khiam
 Kfarchouba
 Kfarfila
 Kfarhamam
 Kfar Tebnit
 Kounin
 Maachouq
 Mahrouna
 Majdel Balhis
 Majdel Selm or Majdal Zun
 Marakeh
 Marjayoun—a Lebanese  Christian village
 Markaba (Marqaba)
 Maroun al-Ras
 Marwahin
 Maaroub
 Mayfadoun
 Meiss el Jabal or Mays al Jabal
 Mlikh
 Miye ou Miye
 Maghdouche
 Nabatiye or Nabatiyeh
 Naqoura (Nakoura, An-Naqurah)
 Niha
 Nmairiyeh
 Odaisseh
 Oum el Ahmad
 Qlayaa
 Qana
 Qantara
 Rab El Thalathine
 Rachaf—a small town
 Rachaya El Foukhar—Hasbaya Qaza
 Ramyah
 Ras Al-Biyada
 Rmaich
 Rmadyeh
 Roûm
 Selaa
 Shabriha
 Shebaa and Shebaa Farms (ownership disputed, occupied by Israel since 1967)
 Shihin, Lebanon
 Shhur
 Siddiqine
 Sidon or Saida
 Sir el Gharbiyeh
 Srifa
 Sujod
 As-Sultaniyah
 Tallousa
 Tair Debbe
 Tayr Harfa or Tair Harfa
 Tayr Falsayh
 Taibeh
 Tebnine (Tebnine, Tibneen), site of the former castle town Toron
 Tulin, Lebanon (Toulin)
 Tura
 Tyre or Sur
 Saida district
 Jezzine district
 Tyre district
 Wadi al-Taym
 Yarin
 Yaroun or Yarun
 Yahun
 Yater or Yatar
 Zibdine
 Zibqin

Other notable sites
 Abou Assouad River
 Awali River
 El Zahrani River
 Litani River
 Saitaniq River
 Kasmieh River
 Blue Line (Lebanon)
 Beaufort Castle
 Palestinian refugee camps in Lebanon, including Ain al-Hilweh, Nabatieh camp and Wavel
 Ras al-Ain, Lebanon

See also
 Israeli occupation of Southern Lebanon
 South Lebanon Army
 South Lebanon conflict (1982–2000)
 Northern District (Israel)
 Operation Litani against the Palestinian Liberation Organization
 United Nations Interim Force in Lebanon (instituted by United Nations Security Council Resolution 425)
 South lebanon security belt

References

External links
 South Lebanon Website

Regions of Lebanon
Geography of Lebanon
Israeli–Lebanese conflict
2006 Lebanon War